North City is a neighborhood within the city of Shoreline, Washington, United States,  located north of Seattle. The neighborhood is centered at 15th Avenue N.E. and N.E 175th Street.

History

The North City neighborhood was named in 1947 by local business owners along 15th Avenue N.E.

See also
Neighborhoods of Shoreline, Washington

References

External links
North City Neighborhood Association

Neighborhoods in Washington (state)